Lemone Lampley (born May 9, 1964) is an American former basketball player and until 2016 was assistant director of Athletic Development at his alma mater, DePaul University.  He left DePaul after completing his master's degree there to found a non profit charitable organization dedicated to helping youth in Chicago to realize their potential called M.O.C.C.H.A, (Men of Color Connected for Higher Achievement).  He played professionally for eight years in Italy, Greece and Spain.

Lampley, a 6'11" center from Chicago, played college basketball for Hall of Fame coach Ray Meyer, then his son Joey Meyer at DePaul.  Despite never being a regular starter for the Blue Demons, Lampley was drafted by the Seattle SuperSonics in the second round of the 1986 NBA draft (38th pick overall).  Though he never played in the NBA, Lampley did play in the top leagues in Spain, Italy and Greece. While in Europe, Lampley twice played in teams that reached the final of the FIBA Korać Cup, winning the trophy in 1990 with Joventut Badalona and losing the final in 1994 with Stefanel Trieste, ironically against PAOK, the team he then joined.

References

External links
Italian League stats
Spanish League stats

1964 births
Living people
American expatriate basketball people in Greece
American expatriate basketball people in Italy
American expatriate basketball people in Spain
American men's basketball players
AMG Sebastiani Basket players
Basketball players from Chicago
CB Zaragoza players
Centers (basketball)
DePaul Blue Demons men's basketball players
Joventut Badalona players
Lega Basket Serie A players
Liga ACB players
Mens Sana Basket players
Pallacanestro Trieste players
P.A.O.K. BC players
Seattle SuperSonics draft picks
Tenerife AB players